Vortigaunts or Alien Slaves are a fictional extra-dimensional species in the Half-Life series of video games by Valve. In Half-Life and its three expansions, Vortigaunts are frequently encountered by the player as hostile non-player characters but later serve as allies in Half-Life 2. The Vortigaunts are depicted in Half-Life as being an enslaved race in an alternative dimension called Xen, subservient to a large creature called the Nihilanth, which itself is a slave to undisclosed masters. In Half-Life 2, the Vortigaunts have broken free of their slavery following Gordon Freeman's killing of the Nihilanth at the end of Half-Life, and actively assist the player and other humans in resisting the Combine occupation of Earth.

Vortigaunts were used as playable characters in the Half-Life series expansion Half-Life: Decay in the bonus chapter "Xen Attacks". They are unlockable via getting an A rank on all chapters.

Vortigaunts are shown as a very communal and cultural race, believing in a force known as "Vortessence" that binds the fabric of the universe and each Vortigaunt together, as well as producing a tradition of poetry and music. Vortigaunts also display the ability to summon and command electrical energy without the need for technology. This ability is used for various activities, such as a means of attack, powering electrical equipment, and healing.

Louis Gossett Jr. provides the voice for the Vortigaunts in Half-Life 2, and was partially chosen due to his role as the alien in the film Enemy Mine. In Episode Two and Half-Life: Alyx, the Vortigaunts' voicing was done by Tony Todd.

The fictional creatures have received a range of critical responses from their various appearances. In addition to their role within the Half-Life series, Vortigaunts have been adapted for machinima productions and have been made into a plush toy by Valve.

Character design
The Vortigaunts in both Half-Life and Half-Life 2 were designed by concept artists Dhabih Eng and Chuck Jones. Initially, Vortigaunts were planned to begin Half-Life as enemy non-player characters, which the player has to win over as allies and lead in rebellion. This idea, however, proved impractical and was abandoned in favor of keeping the Vortigaunts as adversaries. The plan re-emerged for Half-Life 2, in which the species are active allies of the player. The Vortigaunts in Half-Life 2 were originally going to be fully integrated in City 17 alongside the humans under Combine rule. This did not reach fruition; due to the focus on developing the city combat, the resources to accomplish this were not available. As there were so few resulting Vortigaunts in the city, the developers instead decided to involve the Vortigaunts far more substantially in the sections of the game taking place in the countryside surrounding the city. The few Vortigaunts placed inside the city were used to hint at the story arc for the Vortigaunts later in the game. Midway through Half-Life 2, the player witnesses a scene with a deceased Vortigaunt in a prison. Originally, the developers were intending to feature this Vortigaunt as an ally character who, if players rescue him, would fight enemy characters alongside the player. The developers liked this idea, but it was too late in the development to attempt this; instead, the idea was preserved for use in Episode Two. The concept was later showcased in an Episode Two trailer shown at the Games Convention in 2006.

According to series writer Marc Laidlaw, one of the most important goals with Episode Two was to expand on the Vortigaunts as characters, as opposed to just "purveyors of bugbait or Xen koans". As such, Valve added new behaviours, new animations, and new audio to the Vortigaunts. Combine devices called "Vorti-Cells" were to be encountered in Half-Life 2. They were meant to siphon power from captive Vortigaunts in City 17. The player would then be able to free Vortigaunts from these devices to gain their assistance. A similar concept was incorporated into the prequel Half-LIfe: Alyx.

Attributes

Society
Vortigaunts are very intelligent and social creatures. In Half-Life, they serve as basic ground units for the Xen forces, often supporting heavier troops fighting the player and the humans in the Black Mesa Research Facility. They are capable of developing intelligent strategies and tactics to take on their enemies. Initially, Vortigaunts are enslaved to the Nihilanth, a large creature on Xen, who, in turn, claims it is a slave to unknown superiors. On Xen, the Vortigaunts are used as factory workers and drones. In Half-Life 2, Vortigaunts indicate that this slavery has lasted for generations. Despite this, Vortigaunts are shown to have developed an intellectual culture, valuing poetry, music and philosophy. In addition, Vortigaunts practise the husbandry of antlions, large insectoids that live in underground hives, as an ancestral tradition. The death of the Nihilanth at the hands of Gordon Freeman at the end of Half-Life frees the Vortigaunts from their slavery; consequently the Vortigaunts see Freeman as a messianic figure.

Vortigaunts possess their own method of vocal communication, "flux shifting", which they can be heard using in Half-Life 2. This method of communication involves both speakers vocalising at the same time and cannot be understood by other species who lack the auditory anatomy to interpret the sounds. In addition to a standard conversation, flux shifting can be used by Vortigaunts to communicate over long distances. Vortigaunts use scattered English words in Half-Life to taunt the player, although by Half-Life 2 they have learned to speak at least the English language fluently, albeit using archaic words and grammatical structures. In addition, the Vortigaunts believe in a binding life-force referred to as the "Vortessence". The exact nature of the Vortessence is left unclear, although it is revealed that Vortigaunts believe the Vortessence is the fabric of the universe and connects everything.

Depiction
In general, a Vortigaunt is a somewhat humanoid figure with two legs and two arms but has an additional arm protruding from its thorax. Vortigaunts have mottled green skin and digitigrade legs, allowing them to move quickly. Typically, Vortigaunts have a slightly hunched posture. In addition, Vortigaunts have sharp teeth, clawed hands, strong senses, and their faces are dominated by a large red eye. In Half-Life, this eye is surrounded by five smaller eyes, although, in Half-Life 2, this has been reduced to three smaller eyes. A key aspect of the Vortigaunts is their ability to summon energy to their command without the need for any equipment. In-game, this ability is most commonly used as a means of attack, with Vortigaunts' hurling the energy towards foes in the form of green electrical bolts. In addition, Vortigaunts have been shown to be able to use the energy for other purposes, such as assisting in repair work, removing rubble and blockages, recharging the player's HEV suit or powering up electrical generators. Enslaved Vortigaunts are depicted with green collars and shackles, although the means by which these control Vortigaunts is not explored. Vortigaunts are not typically seen wearing clothing, although several Vortigaunts are observed wearing lab coats and chef's clothing in the course of Half-Life 2 and its expansions. Vortigaunts are depicted as meat eaters; the player can observe Vortigaunts' eating human corpses in Half-Life and cooking headcrabs in Half-Life 2, although Half-Life 2 also shows Vortigaunts working in kitchens with chef hats, preparing soups and salads, suggesting that Vortigaunts are omnivores.

Appearances

Half-Life

Vortigaunts are first introduced as one of the primary enemies in Half-Life, and, although not named in-game, were known as Alien Slaves in promotional material,. They are frequently encountered by players throughout Half-Life and its three expansions, Opposing Force, Blue Shift and Decay. They are portrayed as one of the sentient races of Xen, often working in groups or with more heavily armored Xen troops. In the later stages of Half-Life, Vortigaunts are seen working in factory-like environments, constructing or maturing the more heavily armored Xen troops in cocoon-like capsules under the direction of other aliens in the Xen hierarchy.

In the cooperative multiplayer expansion Decay, players have the opportunity to assume the role of two Vortigaunts if they score highly on all missions. In this bonus mission, entitled "Xen Attacks", two Vortigaunts, designated as Drone Subjects X-8973 and R-4913, are given a mission by the Nihilanth to retrieve a number of crystals stolen from Xen by human scientists from the Black Mesa Research Facility.

Half-Life 2
The role of the Vortigaunts is drastically changed in Half-Life 2. Now acting as allies to the player, Vortigaunts have been freed as a result of protagonist Gordon Freeman killing the Nihilanth at the end of Half-Life. Instead of acting with hostility towards humanity, the Vortigaunts are actively engaged in assisting the human resistance against the Combine, a multi-dimensional empire that has invaded and occupied Earth in between Half-Life and Half-Life 2. Vortigaunts are frequently seen at resistance compounds and stations, often performing maintenance work or providing help with experiments, and sometimes assist the player by using their energy abilities to recharge the player's HEV suit. However, a number of Vortigaunts are still in captivity, as at various points in the game, Vortigaunts are shown used as slave labor by the Combine; for example, one Vortigaunt is seen cleaning the floor of a Combine train station with a broom, wearing a similar collar to those worn in Half-Life.

Vortigaunts play a greater part in the story of the series in Half-Life 2s continuations, Episode One and Episode Two. In Episode One, Vortigaunts use unexplained powers to rescue Alyx Vance, the game's deuteragonist, from the top of the Combine Citadel in City 17, saving her from the explosion of the Citadel's reactor at the end of Half-Life 2. The Vortigaunts also free Gordon Freeman from the stasis imposed on him at the end of Half-Life 2 by his enigmatic employer, the G-Man, much to the G-Man's irritation. Episode Two dedicates much of the early part of the game to the Vortigaunts, with a group of four Vortigaunts working to heal Alyx Vance after she is mortally wounded by a Combine Hunter, while tracking and killing the Combine Advisors that fled the Citadel. One Vortigaunt accompanies the player and acts as combat support on an expedition into an antlion hive. In the latter stages of Episode Two, several Vortigaunts are observed in the White Forest missile silo, performing various tasks to facilitate the launch of a satellite to close a Combine super portal.

Half-Life: Alyx
The Vortigaunts return in Half-Life: Alyx, once again as allies to the Resistance. Alyx first encounters an eccentric Vortigaunt who had been forcefully severed from the Vortigaunts' collective consciousness named Gary while journeying through the Quarantine Zone. Gary makes vague allusions to Eli Vance's death in the distant future due to his difficulty with differentiating the past from the future, and later narrowly saves Eli from falling to his death shortly afterwards. In the course of her journey Alyx discovers that a massive Combine prison called "the Vault" is powered with the energy of captured Vortigaunts, one of whom Alyx frees. The Vortigaunt thanks her and promises to help her by releasing more of his kin so that they can take down the rest of the Combine substations that are keeping the Vault powered. It is later revealed that the Combine are using the Vortigaunts to power the Vault, because their harnessed energy is the only thing that can effectively contain the G-Man.

Cultural impact

Merchandise

The character of the Vortigaunt has been popular enough to inspire the creation of a Vortigaunt plush toy. The toy was designed by Dhabih Eng and was sold and distributed via Valve's online store. The toy was released in December 2006 and due to the proximity to Christmas, the Vortigaunt was accompanied by a to-scale Santa Claus hat. A review of the plush toy was favorable, praising the toy as sturdy, as well as giving credit for its articulation and detail.

Reception
The change of the Vortigaunts from enemy characters to allied characters in Half-Life 2 was described as "intriguing" by reviewers, with PC Zone stating that the Vortigaunts were one of the most interesting characters in the game, playing a role "somewhere between Yoda and ET".

The role of the Vortigaunts in Episode Two was met with more approval by critics, who described the Vortigaunt who accompanies the player in the early parts of the game as "a great joy to fight alongside", praising the improved artificial intelligence and noting that "the fact that they're not trying to intricately imitate real-life people" significantly aided the presentation of the Vortigaunts. In addition, IGN praised the visual and character overhaul given to the Vortigaunt in Episode Two.

References

External links

Vortigaunt at Combine OverWiki, a Half-Life wiki

Extraterrestrial characters in video games
Fictional characters from parallel universes
Fictional extraterrestrial life forms
Half-Life characters
Fictional slaves in video games
Fictional soldiers in video games
Video game characters introduced in 1998
Video game species and races